The 2017 Euro Winners Cup was the fifth edition of Euro Winners Cup, an annual continental beach soccer tournament for top men's European clubs, similar to that of the UEFA Champions League, organised by Beach Soccer Worldwide (BSWW). This season the tournament was being held in Nazaré, Portugal, from 26 May till 4 June 2017. 

Italian team Viareggio BS were the defending champions but lost in the Round of 16 to Ukrainian side Artur Music.

Artur Music ultimately went on to lose in the final to Portuguese team SC Braga who claimed their first European title.

Gabriele Gori was top scorer for the second year running, following up his top scorer award at the World Cup just a few weeks prior.

Participating teams
25 nations represented by a record of 54 clubs participated in the tournament. 28 teams are qualified directly for the main round, including Viarregio (the 2016 trophy holders), ACD Sótão (as host team), SC Braga (as runner-up of host nation) and 25 national champions (note, BS Lazio clinching the berth of Italy national champions since Viarregio is also a European champion). The preliminary round was disputed by all the remaining teams that sign in (26 teams). At first four more teams sign in, but didn't take part in competition.

Preliminary round
With an increase in the number of teams, five groups of four teams and two groups of three teams constitute the preliminary stage, competing in a round-robin format. The winners of each group advance to main stage. The group allocations were drawn on 10 April 2017. The matches were held from 26 May till 28 May 2017. Seven group winners and one best-ranked runner-up (BSC Artur Music) advanced to the main round.

Group 1

Group 2

Group 3

Group 4

Group 5

Group 6

Group 7

Main round
With an increase in the number of teams, nine groups of four teams will constitute the group stage, competing in a round-robin format. The group allocations were drawn on 4 April 2017. The matches were held from 29 May till 31 May 2017. Nine group winners and seven best-ranked runners-up advanced to the play-off round.

Group A

Group B

Group C

Group D

Group E

Group F

Group G

Group H

Group I

Play-off round

Bracket

Round of 16
The matches were held on 1 June 2017.

|}

Quarter-finals
The matches were held on 2 June 2017.
For 9–16 places

|}

For 1–8 places

|}

Semi-finals
The matches were held on 3 June 2017.
For 13–16 places

|}

For 9–12 places

|}

For 5–8 places

|}

For 1–4 places

|}

Placement matches
The matches were held on 4 June 2017.
For 15–16 places

|}

For 13–14 places

|}

For 11–12 places

|}

For 9–10 places

|}

For 7–8 places

|}

For 5–6 places

|}

For 3–4 places

|}

Cup Final

|}

Awards

Source:

Final standings

See also
Mundialito de Clubes

References

External links
Euro Winners Cup 2017, beachsoccer.com
Euro Winners Cup 2017 Preliminary Round, beachsoccer.com
 2017 Men's Euro Winners Cup's top 5 goals
 2017 Men's Euro Winners Cup's Best Moments

Euro Winners Cup
Euro
2017
2017 in beach soccer
Nazaré, Portugal
May 2017 sports events in Europe
June 2017 sports events in Europe